The Marshall Major (Model 1967 ) was a bass guitar amplifier made by Marshall. It was introduced in 1967 as the "Marshall 200" (in reference to the power of the amplifier). It had a plexi panel and two inputs in one channel, but in contrast with the 100 watt heads made by Marshall, the first series had split tone controls similar to the Sound City amps. For the second series, in late 1968, Marshall reverted to ordinary passive tone controls, and was called "Marshall Major". Some authors claim the first version had active tone controls but this is incorrect, the schematics for all versions are available online.

The amplifier used KT88 output valves, two ECC83 preamp valves and one ECC82 valve. Approximately 1,200 of these amps were produced from 1967 to 1974; Marshall ceased production when the supply of KT88s ran out.

The amplifier was used by rock musicians who needed very high volume. A notable user is Ritchie Blackmore; his Major had the two input channels cascaded into one, essentially creating the first Marshall with a master volume.

Other versions
The Major was also made as a PA amplifier, Model 1966 (from 1967 to 1971, with eight inputs in four channels; known in 1967 as the PA 200), and as a bass amplifier, Model 1978 (from 1967 to 1974). A line of on-ear headphones by Marshall have also been issued with the same name.

Notable users
 Jimi Hendrix

Ritchie Blackmore
 Tom Bukovac
 John Frusciante
 Josh Klinghoffer
 Joe Perry
 Mick Ronson
 Jack L. Stroem
 Stevie Ray Vaughan
 Dan Andriano
 Frank Zappa
 Daniel Rydholm
 Lemmy Kilmister

References

Instrument amplifiers
Marshall amplifiers
Valve amplifiers